Maria Sorvillo is an Italian football defender, currently playing for UPC Tavagnacco in Italy's Serie A. She has won five leagues with SS Lazio, CF Bardolino and Torres CF.

She has been a member of the Italian national team.

References

1982 births
Living people
Italian women's footballers
Italy women's international footballers
Serie A (women's football) players
S.S. Lazio Women 2015 players
Torres Calcio Femminile players
A.S.D. AGSM Verona F.C. players
U.P.C. Tavagnacco players
Women's association football defenders
Torino Women A.S.D. players
Roma Calcio Femminile players
People from Aversa
Footballers from Campania
Sportspeople from the Province of Caserta